Leixlip United F.C. are a football club from Leixlip, Kildare, who play their home games at Leixlip Amenities Centre.

Life before 1959 
Leixlip United had existed for the seasons of 1959–60,1960–61 and 1961–62 before problems arising from a shortage of local players caused the club to fold.

Ormeau A.F.C. - The Leixlip connection 
Originally based in the inner city and founded by George Bendal, an English ex-Manchester City Goalkeeper, they played in Division 1 in the Leinster Senior League. When the club had problems finding a ground they relocated to Leixlip in 1965 in Easton Park, quite a few of the locals joined a few and thus the seeds for what would become Leixlip United had sown. Upon George Bendal's death, Ormeau A.F.C. also folded. In 1969 when Leixlip United reformed they benefited from players who had played in the Leinster Senior League for Ormeau including Theo Watkins, a junior international goalkeeper.

The early years 
After the club's formation, the main focus was to acquire a permanent ground. The club first played their games in Greenlane where two primary schools now stand loaned to the club from the local parish priests.

After the land had been occupied by the two schools the schoolboy section played at Greenlane and the Juniors secured a pitch in Dodsboro with assistance from Lucan United.

The club found a home due to the kindness of the Honourable Desmond Guinness on his land in Leixlip village the schoolboy section and Juniors played their matches upon this ground.

The club moved to their current home in the Leixlip Amenities Centre in October 1979 where they were allocated two pitches for the 1981–82 season.

Senior Men's Section

Athletic Union League
Leixlip United first competed in the Athletic Union League and Leinster Junior League Counties Division. John Giltrap and Brian Watters where in charge of the A.U.L side which competed first in Division 3A, Benny Flanagan was in charge of the Leinster Junior League side.

Within 4 years Giltrap and Watters had led the first team to the top division within the A.U.L where they stayed for five years during this time the second team joined the A.U.L and reached the top division in 81/82.

After relegation from the top division, the club remained in the second division from 78/79 until 86/87 whereupon they were relegated into the third division where they remained until leaving the A.U.L in 87/88

One of the more noteworthy campaigns the club enjoyed in the A.U.L was the season 1970/71, where Leixlip lost just once and claimed 52 points from 30 games winning promotion from Division 2, beating out St.Josephs Boys and Tolka Rovers to the title.
In that year's Annual report stakes the Hon Sec. Jim Younger noted that "One can visualize in this growing suburb, Leixlip Utd. may in time become of the foremost clubs in the country.."

Leinster Senior League
After two years in the A.U.L third division, the team left the A.U.L and enter the Leinster Senior League in 88/89 entering into Division 1A and Division 2B during the following half a decade the club were relegated into Division 1b

Recent Successes
The Club remained between the 1A and 1B divisions of the Leinster Senior League. The appointment of John Martin marked a period of incomparable success for the Senior team.

2012/2013 saw Leixlip win the Senior 1  title comfortably ahead of UCD and Verona FC and in doing so they reached the highest tier of the Leinster Senior League; Senior Sunday. This would be the first time the club would ever compete at this level.

In 2014/2015 Leixlip where immediately relegated from the Senior division and Joh Martin stepped down as Manager. After his departure, former Saturday side Manager Brendan Lennon took over the club as they embarked upon their Senior 1 Sunday campaign in 2015/2016 campaign leading them to a respectable 7th place in his first season.

The 2016/2017 season was a thrilling campaign for Leixlip in which they won promotion to the Senior division again for the second time ever in the club's history. This season saw Leixlip play some thrilling attacking football finishing third in the league behind Newbridge and Portmarnock respectively. Only losing one game between November and May and a 2-1 win over Senior Division challengers Crumlin United in the Metropolitan Cup being two highlights for the club during this season.

The 2017/2018 season saw Leixlip relegated from the Senior Division after a valiant effort to stay up, Brendan Lennon resigned at the end of the season following a 1-0 victory to recently crowned League Champions Bluebell United.

External links

Association football clubs in County Kildare
Leinster Senior League (association football) clubs
Sport in Leixlip
1969 establishments in Ireland